Governor Waddington may refer to:

John Waddington (governor) (1890–1957), Governor of Barbados from 1938 to 1941, and Governor of Northern Rhodesia from to 1941 to 1947
David Waddington, Baron Waddington (1929–2017), Governor of Bermuda from 1992 to 1997